Dongtan is a township in Hwaseong, Gyeonggi, South Korea, with many shops and restaurants. There are also 4 residential skyscrapers of 70-80 floors. They are collectively called Metapolis and contain a shopping mall. Dongtan also has the Suseo high-speed railway (SRT) that goes from Suseo station to Jije station.

New towns in South Korea
Hwaseong, Gyeonggi
New towns started in the 2000s